Tipula melanoceros is a species of fly in the family Tipulidae. It is found in the  Palearctic. It is in marshy woods and on moorland. Tipula melanoceros is a late summer species which flies from August to October.

References

External links
Images representing Tipula at BOLD

Tipulidae
Insects described in 1833
Nematoceran flies of Europe
Taxa named by Theodor Emil Schummel